EKSPLA is a laser manufacturing company based in Lithuania. EKSPLA is known for their lasers and laser systems, as well as other photonics components. The company is supplying their products for scientific, OEM (Original Equipment Manufacturer) & industrial applications.

History
All Lithuanian laser technology companies trace their roots to Vilnius University and the Institute of Physics. Members of Lithuanian Academy of Sciences and of the Institute of Physics organised an experimental workshop and established the EKSMA company in 1983. It represented the scientific instrumentation of the former Soviet Union.

In 1992, an EKSMA laser design and manufacturing spin-off named EKSPLA started operating as a separate legal entity. Gradual development of the company can be illustrated by its customer base expansion to Japan in 1993, and United States in 1996. Today it covers all the world.

The first EKSPLA commercial picosecond diode-pumped laser was developed in 2002. Currently, (2007) the company supplies more than 20 types of diode-pumped solid-state lasers.

In 2004, EKSMA became a holding company through acquisition of EKSPLA. The shareholders agreed to consolidate all laser and photonics related businesses of both companies into EKSPLA, and two divisions were established: Laser & Laser Systems and Photonics Components. Although company operates under the EKSPLA name, both EKSPLA and EKSMA trademarks are used for laser and components businesses.

Effective from 1 July 2008, all components business activities (covering optical components, laser & nonlinear crystals, positioning mechanics, mounts and optical tables) were moved from EKSPLA to an Optolita company with the brand name of and doing business as EKSMA OPTICS.

Awards
In 2005, EKSPLA was awarded as the knowledge economy company of the year. The award was given as an acknowledgement of the company's constant investments and achievements in development and marketing of knowledge-based products, cooperation with research institutions, and support to the knowledge-based economy development projects.

In 2007, EKSPLA CEO Kestutis Jasiunas, together with other scientists and entrepreneurs (Dr. Romualdas Danielius, Dr. Rimantas Kraujalis and Prof. Habil. Dr. Algis Petras Piskarskas), received the Partnership Award of the National Advancement Awards. This was an acknowledgement of major contributions to Lithuania laser science and industry consolidation.

Products
EKSPLA has 8 product lines: scientific lasers and laser systems, industrial lasers, laser spectroscopy, and laser electronics components. The company manufactures and supplies photonic products and services for OEM and R&D applications.

Lasers and laser systems
Since its foundation, the company was manufacturing only flash-lamp pumped lasers. But as diode pumping results in better overall efficiency and beam quality, a decision was made to replace them with diode-pumped lasers. Currently the EKSPLA laser product line comprises mainly tunable wavelength and diode-pumped lasers.

If classified by pulse duration, the company manufactures femtosecond,  nanosecond and picosecond lasers.

Most common EKSPLA lasers applications:
 Research and Development
 Spectroscopy
 Ti:Sapphire and dye laser pumping
 OPG/OPA, OPO pumping
 Plasma studies
 LIDAR
 Photobiology, photochemistry
 Micromachining
 Marking
 Seeding 
 Engraving
 Ablation
 Other applications

Laser micromachining
In 2007, EKSPLA developed the Master Series laser marking systems for material processing. A diode-pumped laser integrated in the system enables higher productivity. This product line has been designed with industrial applications in mind.

Laser marking systems can be used to perform various tasks: to mark serial numbers, barcodes for identification, small "invisible" signs for trademark protection or even to scribe semiconductors or plastics. Laser marking systems are suitable for creating 2D and 3D patterns inside glass.

Later all laser material processing workstation business was transferred to ELAS – laser micromachining workstations manufacturer.

Opto-electronic components
The following opto-electronic components are produced:
 Pockels cells. The material for Pockels cells are BBO and KD*P nonlinear crystals. Pockels cells are used in DPSS Q-switching lasers and are the basic components of electro-optic modulators. Pockels cells applications: high repetition rate regenerative amplifier control, beam chopper, cavity dumping.
 Drivers for Pockels cells. These have been designed to enable Q-switching of nanosecond lasers without the use of phase retardation plates. High voltage applied to the Pockels cell inhibits oscillation. At a certain time HV is switched to ground, thus allowing the laser to radiate.
 Crystal Ovens. Ovens accommodate temperature-sensitive nonlinear crystals. They are used for precise temperature stabilization of laser harmonic crystals of various sizes, and for heating of both bulk and thin periodically poled crystals.
 Flashlamp drivers
 Laser cooling units
 Laser crystal ovens

Partnership
Ekspla has a successful track record of international collaboration in NATO and EUREKA programs. In 2002, Ekspla was appointed the first Lithuania-based coordinator of a European Union FP5 project.

The company participates in a number of research projects of Lithuanian State Science and Studies Foundation, with research groups from the Institute of Physics and Laser Research Centre at Vilnius University.

Ekspla is closely collaborating with other Lithuanian enterprises in the photonics field: Standa, Optida, and Light Conversion. In 2005–2007, these four companies carried out a successfully completed research and technological development project “Lasers for microprocessing and diagnostics” partially financed from EU Structural Funds. The purpose of the project was to develop a new type of laser meeting the requirements for industrial applications. Light Conversion and EKSPLA did the research work for development of high repetition rate, short pulse, high medium power diode-pumped lasers and investigated harmonic generation, and tunable optical parametric radiation. Such sources of radiation are supposed to be used in microprocessing. as well as other applications.

The company sells its products directly or through distributors. Distributors are found in  China, Germany, Great Britain, France, India, Israel, Japan, Liechtenstein, Mexico, Poland, Romania, Russia, Switzerland, Taiwan, United States.

References

Manufacturing companies of Lithuania
Manufacturing companies of the Soviet Union
Companies based in Vilnius
Companies established in 1983
1983 establishments in Lithuania
Science and technology in Lithuania
Lithuanian brands